Anthony Stirrat (born 30 June 1970) is a male Scottish former international cyclist. He competed in the track time trial at the 1992 Summer Olympics.

Stirrat is a multiple British National champion, winning the track time trial title once, the Scratch title twice and the team sprint title once. He also represented Scotland in three track events at the 1998 Commonwealth Games in Kuala Lumpur, Malaysia.

Palmarès

1991
2nd Time Trial, 1991 British National Track Championships

1992
1st Time Trial, 1992 British National Track Championships
1st Scratch, 1992 British National Track Championships

1993
1st Team Sprint, 1993 British National Track Championships
2nd Time Trial, 1993 British National Track Championships
2nd Omnium, 1993 British National Track Championships

1994
1st Scratch, 1994 British National Track Championships
3rd Points, 1994 British National Track Championships

1995
2nd Scratch, 1995 British National Track Championships
2nd Omnium, 1995 British National Track Championships
3rd Points, 1995 British National Track Championships
3rd Time Trial, 1995 British National Track Championships

2005
3rd Omnium, 2005 British National Track Championships

2006
3rd Omnium, 2006 British National Track Championships

See also
City of Edinburgh Racing Club
Achievements of members of City of Edinburgh Racing Club

References

External links
 

1970 births
Living people
British male cyclists
Olympic cyclists of Great Britain
Cyclists at the 1992 Summer Olympics
Sportspeople from Irvine, North Ayrshire
Cyclists at the 1998 Commonwealth Games
Commonwealth Games competitors for Scotland